Andenes Church is a parish church of the Church of Norway in Andøy Municipality in Nordland county, Norway.  It is located in the village of Andenes on the northern tip of the island of Andøya.  It is one of the churches for the Andøy parish which is part of the Vesterålen prosti (deanery) in the Diocese of Sør-Hålogaland.  The white, wooden church was built in a long church style in 1876 by the architect Ingebrigt Julin.  The church seats about 400 people.

History
The oldest existing historical records of the church date back to 1589, although the church was not new at that time. Some of inventory of the church dates back to the late 1400s. A church on the site was demolished in 1600 and a new replacement was consecrated in 1607. After more than a century, that church was replaced in 1734. This building was consecrated on 30 June 1876 by the Bishop Waldemar Hvoslef.

Media gallery

See also
List of churches in Sør-Hålogaland

References

Andøy
Churches in Nordland
Wooden churches in Norway
19th-century Church of Norway church buildings
Churches completed in 1876
16th-century establishments in Norway
Long churches in Norway